The Metropolitan Library Service Agency (MELSA) is a regional library system in the Minneapolis–Saint Paul metropolitan area of Minnesota. It consists of eight library systems in seven counties, with a total of over one hundred member libraries. Library card holders at any member system may borrow materials from another MELSA member system.

MELSA provides numerous resources for its member libraries such as electronic books.

Member Regional Library Systems
Anoka County Library
Carver County Library
Dakota County Library
Hennepin County Library
Ramsey County Library
Saint Paul Public Library
Scott County Library
Washington County Library

References

Non-profit organizations based in Minnesota
Library consortia in Minnesota